Mount Raoul Blanchard is the highest peak in the Laurentian Mountains, Quebec, Canada at .

The peak is named after Raoul Blanchard (1877-1965), a geographer who had significant interest in the French Alps and the mountains of Quebec.

References 
 Peakbagger

Raoul Blanchard
Landforms of Capitale-Nationale